Thugs is a 2023 Indian Tamil-language  action drama film directed by Brinda and starring Hridhu Haroon, Simha, Munishkanth and R. K. Suresh & in the lead roles. It was released on 24 February 2023.

Cast

Production
Hridhu Haroon, the son of producer Shibu Thameens, made his feature film debut through the project. A remake of the Malayalam film Swathanthryam Ardharathriyil (2018), the film's story was revealed to be based on a few gangsters from Kanyakumari, and was shot in Nagarkoil and Kochi in a single schedule. The film was dubbed into Telugu as Konaseema Thugs.

Soundtrack
Soundtrack was composed by Sam C. S.
Amman - Sam C. S.
Ey Azhagiye - Kapil Kabilan, Chinmayi

Reception 
The film was released on 24 February 2023 across Tamil Nadu. A critic from Times of India noted it was "a well-made prison-break drama that engages you in parts". A reviewer from Cinema Express wrote it was "a fairly engaging retelling with invested performances"..Dinamalar gave 2.5 rating out of 5 . Hindu Tamil Thisai critic wrote that " Another feature that compensates for the pace of the screenplay is Praveen Anthony's cinematography".

References

External links 
 

 2023 films
 2020s Tamil-language films
Films about prison escapes
Films set in prison
Films scored by Sam C. S.